The 1967 Davidson Wildcats football team represented Davidson College as a member of the Southern Conference (SoCon) during the 1967 NCAA University Division football season. Led by third-year head coach Homer Smith, the Wildcats compiled an overall record of 4–5 with a mark of 1–5 in conference play, placing last out of eight teams in the SoCon..

Schedule

References

Davidson
Davidson Wildcats football seasons
Davidson Wildcats football